Paykan Football Club (Bâshgâh-e Futbâl-e Peykân) is a football team based in Tehran, Iran. The team is sponsored by Iran's main automobile manufacturer Iran Khodro and is named after one of its older products; the Paykan car. Paykan F.C. is the football club of the multisport Paykan Sport Club which also includes Basketball and volleyball teams.

History

Establishment
The club was established in 1967 by Mahmoud Khayami with financial help from the Iran Khodro factory. The main objective was to promote their factory's products, and improve their reputation. They were able to lure great players such as Ali Parvin, Majid Halvaei and Amir Abedini, and several of the Persepolis players of the time. In 1969 the team became the Tehran City League's champions and the team appeared to have a bright future. The team was dissolved in 1970 after a series of difficulties between the players and management. Most of the players went back to Persepolis.

Rebirth of Paykan

Paykan still operated without a football team specifically in the 1980s but carried on with basketball, handball, and volleyball teams. Paykan did not have a football team until the year 2000, when they were able to buy Bahman's shares and participate in the top level of Iranian football after 30 years. The team participated in the 2000–01 Azadegan League with Bahman's squad but with a different coach.

Among Iranian football clubs, the team is known to have one of the better organizations in terms of facilities and management. The team had little success and were relegated from the Iran Pro League in the 2004–05 season. They were back in the IPL for the 06–07 season where they finished a respectable 7th and showed their ability to compete at the highest standard.

Relocation to Qazvin
In 2008 Paykan was moved to Qazvin because the city of Tehran had many football teams with low attendance figures. They started the season well but toward the end their results got worse. The team changed their coach in the last weeks of the 2008–09 season and finished in mid table. Although they finished in the top half of the table in 2009–10 season the club chairman decided to replace Hamid Derakhshan with Mohammad Ahmadzadeh as the head coach. Paykan were relegated in 2010–2011, but the following year they earned their promotion back to the Iran Pro League for the 2012–2013 season.

Tehran and Qods
Paykan moved back to Tehran and started playing in the newly renovated Takhti Stadium. Paykan was relegated to Azadegan League again in April 2013. Before the start of the 2013–14 season Paykan once again relocate and this time to the city of Qods. In the 2013–2014 season Paykan finished 2nd in the Azadegan League, thus giving them a shot at Iran Pro League promotion. Paykan defeated Siah Jamegan 3–1 on aggregate and advanced to play Iran Pro League club Fajr Sepasi in a promotion play-off. The first game in Shiraz ended 0–0 with neither team getting the upper hand. But, in the return leg in Qods, Paykan achieved promotion with a lone goal in the 65th minute. Following the good support from the people of Qods, Paykan announced they will be playing in that city for the 2014–15 Persian Gulf Pro League season. At the end of the 2014–15 season, Paykan finished 15th and was relegated.

In the 2015–16 Azadegan League season, Paykan finished first and were directly promoted to the Persian Gulf Pro League. In the winter of 2017, after a good first half of the season, Paykan became the first ever Persian Gulf Pro League side to sign an Afghan player, when they signed Afghan national team captain Faysal Shayesteh.

Seasons

Sponsorship

Official sponsors
For the 2007/08 season it has been announced that Paykan's official kit sponsor will be ISACO.

Kit providers
 2008/09: Majid
 2009/10: Daei 
 2011/12: Umbro

Club chairmen
Nader Shahsavari (1970–05)
Hossein Kafami (2005–06)
Ibrahim Sanaei (2006–07)
Mostafa Karkhaneh (2007–08)
Mohammad-Reza Davarzani (2008)
Kamran Sahebpanah (2008–10)
Mahmoud Shiyi (2010–2021)
Amir Atabakhsh (2022- present)

Club managers

Managerial history

 Alan Rogers (1969–70)
 Stuart Williams (1970)
 Klaus Schlappner (2000–01)
 Hamid Alidoosti (2001–02)
 Bijan Zolfagharnasab (2002–03)
 Homayoun Shahrokhi (2003–04)
 Mohammad Mayeli Kohan (2004–05)
 Farhad Kazemi (2005–06)
 Samvel Darbinyan (2006–08)
 Ali Asghar Modir Roosta (2008–09)
 Hamid Derakhshan (2009–10)
 Mohammad Ahmadzadeh (2010)
 Hamid Alidousti (2010–11)
 Mohammad Hossein Ziaei (2011)
 Farhad Kazemi (2011–12)
 Abdollah Veisi (2012–13)
 Firouz Karimi (2013)
 Farhad Kazemi (2013–14)
 Mansour Ebrahimzadeh (2014)
 Samad Marfavi (2014–15)
 Alireza Marzban (2015–16)
 Majid Jalali (2016–18)
 Hossein Faraki (2018–20)
 Mehdi Tartar (2020–21)
 Mojtaba Hosseini (2021–)

Players

First-team squad

For recent transfers, see List of Iranian football transfers summer 2022.

Former players
For notable former players, see :Category:Paykan F.C. players.

Honours
Iran Championship Cup:
Winners (1): 1968
Azadegan League:
 Winners (2): 2011–12, 2015–16
 Runners–up (1): 2005–06

References

External links
Official website
Peykan's History in IPL
Farhad Kazemi's official website
Club profile at Iran Pro League official website

Association football clubs established in 1967
Sport in Tehran
Football clubs in Tehran
1967 establishments in Iran